Ozernoye is a rural locality (a village) in Krasnobashkirsky Selsoviet, Abzelilovsky District, Bashkortostan, Russia. The population was 595 as of 2010. There are 8 streets.

Geography 
Ozernoye is located 31 km northeast of Askarovo (the district's administrative centre) by road. Mikhaylovka is the nearest rural locality.

References 

Rural localities in Abzelilovsky District